Oaklands is a hamlet in the civil parish of Welwyn, in Hertfordshire, England. It is in the Haldens Ward of the Borough of Welwyn Hatfield. In 2020 it had an estimated population of 8077.

References

External links

Hamlets in Hertfordshire
Welwyn